Ahmadreza Ahmadi (born 1940) is an Iranian poet and screenwriter. The history of Persian modern poetry calls him the founder of New Wave Poetry in Iran.

Ahmadi was born in 1940 in Kerman, Iran. He moved to Tehran in 1948. In Tehran, he attended the Adab school and in 1954 entered Dar ol-Fonoun. Two individuals, who according to him have been instrumental to his love for literature, are his maternal nephew, the writer Abdolrahim Ahmadi, and his teacher at Dar ul-Fonoun, Mr Mohammad Shirvāni.

Ahmadi's first book of poetry, Tarh (Sketch), was published in 1962. His poetry has its roots in French Surrealism and the American Imagists specially in poets like Saint John Perse, Paul Eluard, Louis Aragon and Ezra Pound.

References

External links 
 Ahmad Reza Ahmadi at the Internet Movie Database
  Some poems of Ahmadreza Ahmadi in English
 Some Poems In English
 Shoka Sahrā'i, The Poet of Delight and Loneliness, in Persian, Jadid Online, 14 March 2009, .Audio slideshow:  (6 min 41 sec).

1940 births
Living people
People from Kerman Province
Iranian male poets
Persian-language poets